= Sunhak =

Muslim community in India

The Sunhak are a Muslim community in the state of Himachal Pradesh in India.
